This is a list of events from British radio in 1959.

Events
 The BBC Third Programme becomes available in Wales on VHF from Wenvoe transmitting station.

Programme debuts
 3 April
 Pick of the Week on the BBC Home Service (1959–Present)
 We're in Business (comedy series starring Peter Jones) on the BBC Home Service (1959–1960)
 29 April – The Navy Lark on the BBC Light Programme (1959–1977)
 3 July –  Sing Something Simple on the BBC Light Programme (1959–2001)
 25 November –  Your Hundred Best Tunes on the BBC Light Programme (1959–2007)

Endings
 29 December –  Hancock's Half Hour (1954–1959)

Continuing radio programmes

1930s
 In Town Tonight (1933–1960)

1940s
 Music While You Work (1940–1967)
 Sunday Half Hour (1940–2018)
 Desert Island Discs (1942–Present)
 Family Favourites (1945–1980)
 Down Your Way (1946–1992)
 Have A Go (1946–1967)
 Housewives' Choice (1946–1967)
 Letter from America (1946–2004)
 Woman's Hour (1946–Present)
 Twenty Questions (1947–1976)
 Any Questions? (1948–Present)
 Mrs Dale's Diary (1948–1969)
 Take It from Here (1948–1960)
 Billy Cotton Band Show (1949–1968)
 A Book at Bedtime (1949–Present)
 Ray's a Laugh (1949–1961)

1950s
 The Archers (1950–Present)
 Educating Archie (1950–1960)
 Listen with Mother (1950–1982)
 The Goon Show (1951–1960)
 From Our Own Correspondent (1955–Present)
 Pick of the Pops (1955–Present)
 The Clitheroe Kid (1957–1972)
 My Word! (1957–1988)
 Test Match Special (1957–Present)
 The Today Programme (1957–Present)

Births
 9 January – Andy Kershaw, world music presenter
 11 April – John Myers, radio executive and presenter (died 2019)
 22 May – Graham Fellows, comedy performer
 2 October – Kevin Eldon, comedy actor

Deaths
 26 January – Larry Stephens, comedy scriptwriter (born 1923)

See also 
 1959 in British music
 1959 in British television
 1959 in the United Kingdom
 List of British films of 1959

References 

 
Years in British radio
Radio